Washington National Opera (WNO) is an American opera company in Washington, D.C. Formerly the Opera Society of Washington and the Washington Opera, the company received Congressional designation as the National Opera Company in 2000.  Performances are now given in the Opera House of the John F. Kennedy Center for the Performing Arts.

Opera in Washington, DC had become established after World War I and it did flourish for a time as the Washington National Opera Association  until the Depression and World War Two years, and into the 1960s in various outdoor opera venues.  However, with the establishment of the Opera Society of Washington in 1956–57, the way was laid for a company to function in the city, especially after the opening of the Kennedy Center in 1971 and its move there in 1979.

After making initial appearances with the company from 1986 onwards, tenor Plácido Domingo took over as general director in 1996, a post which he held until June 2011, after which the company, which was undergoing financial problems, came under the auspices of the Kennedy Center administration.

The Opera Society of Washington

Washington National Opera was established in 1957 as the Opera Society of Washington by Day Thorpe, the music critic of the now defunct Washington Star, but then the most influential Washington newspaper of its day. Paul Callaway, the choirmaster and organist of the Washington National Cathedral, was its first music director. Together, the two set out to seek funding and they found support from Gregory and Peggy Smith who provided $10,000 as seed money for a production of Mozart's Die Entführung aus dem Serail which would be performed following the end of their summer season (which Calloway conducted) by the Washington Symphony Orchestra.

Characteristic of Thorpe and Callaway's early years was a rejection of cuts to the scores, a rejection of opera in English translation, and a rejection of expensive scenery as well as of "fat sopranos" and "self-centered tenors".

The pair set out to seek a new public and, beginning with the first production of Die Entführung on 31 January 1957, the company presented opera in George Washington University's Lisner Auditorium, albeit a small venue with limited facilities. However, as one critic noted: "There was no 'company' in the literal sense.  Each production had to be conceived, planned, and arranged individually, and financial support had to be scraped up opera by opera.  Improvisation was the order of the day".

The early years, 1956 to 1966
Four months later, the Society staged a double bill of Gian Carlo Menotti's opera The Old Maid and the Thief along with his ballet The Unicorn, The Gorgon, and the Manticore.  It was very successful with both the public and critics alike. Successful presentations followed from November 1957 onwards: Fidelio; Ariadne auf Naxos; Idomeneo; a double bill of Schoenberg's Erwartung and Stravinsky's Le Rossignol (conducted by the composer); and a December 1961 The Magic Flute which resulted in an invitation from President John F. Kennedy at the White House for some excerpts from the opera.

By this time, the attention of the national press had been caught.  A December 1958 Newsweek full-page article on the company was headlined "Sparkle on the Potomac", and Howard Taubman of the New York Times visited regularly, followed by headlines reading "Capital Revival" and "Sparkle on the Potomac"

However, there was not always such clear sailing, and the company was to experience a series of ups and downs in the first few years of the 1960s.  Initially, there was further success: bringing Igor Stravinsky to Washington was the work of Bliss Herbert, then the Artistic Administrator of the Santa Fe Opera who had been involved in that company's early years when the composer regularly visited Santa Fe. However, the first Stravinsky production – The Rake's Progress – was "the most "ill-starred" opera in the Society's history", largely the result of singers' illnesses.  But a later double bill of Stravinsky conducting Le Rossignol (along with Schoenberg's Erwartung) was a triumph.

However, as the 1960s progressed, further disasters were to follow.  These included "a fiasco of unforgivable proportions", an English-language The Magic Flute which caused Paul Callaway's resignation.  Some drastic measures were called for.

Changes in direction, 1966 to 1977
Three new faces were to bring "imagination and flair to the company" during the period up to 1977 and, by that date, another new face made a short but dramatic appearance in the company's history: bass-baritone George London became general manager.

Taking over as general manager in 1967 was Richard Pearlman, under whose tenure were staged well-received productions of The Turn of the Screw, La bohème, and the first production of Barber's Vanessa.  By 1972 Ian Strasfogel, with considerable experience from working at the Metropolitan Opera, took over the helm with the aim of giving it a "businesslike foundation" "it never had in its sixteen years, in spite of the excellent productions it has often achieved".  

One early success was a production of Kurt Weill's Rise and Fall of the City of Mahagonny with the composer's widow, Lotte Lenya, in attendance.  She described it as "the best production she has ever seen". Other significant productions followed, but, in summing up Strasfogel's success, author Mary Jane Phillips-Matz concludes that "his main achievement, though, was his artistic oversight, for by the mid-1970s critics were regularly covering the Opera Society's extraordinary programming and grants were coming in from important foundations."

During this period of the 1970s another person was to enter the scene, stage director Frank Rizzo.  There followed a stunning Madama Butterfly and other important productions and his association with the company continued into the 1980s with his introduction in 1984 of the Canadian Opera Company's surtitles system, whereby an English translation appeared above the proscenium arch.

Also while under Strasfogel's tenure, the Opera Society made its move into the newly opened Kennedy Center for the Performing Arts in 1972. This was to have a profound impact on the company, especially since George London, after retirement from the stage, became Artistic Administrator at the Kennedy Center until its 1971 opening and then Executive Director of the Nation Opera Institute.  He directed a production of Die Walküre for the opera company in 1974 and was courted to become General Director for the 1977 season.

The Washington Opera

Under George London, 1977

In addition to running a fiscally sound company with packed houses, its deficit reduced by two-thirds, and exciting productions such as the city's first Thaïs in 1976, another of George London's major achievements was the renaming of the company, first announced in The Washington Post on 13 May 1977.  As described by Phillips-Matz, "at this point in the company's history, the programming was smart, varied, and exciting" but progress was suddenly brought to a halt by the July 1977 heart attack suffered by George London.  He was never able to return to the company, but his legacy was that "by giving it a new name, a fresh image, and a lot of heft, he brought the company into the national and international opera scene and put it on the road to top rank of producing organizations."

Under Martin Feinstein, 1980 to 1996
Martin Feinstein succeeded London as General Director from 1980 to 1995 and "spent the next 16 years luring artists of the stature of Gian Carlo Menotti (who directed La Boheme), Daniel Barenboim (who conducted Così fan tutte) and Plácido Domingo (who debuted in Washington in 1986 with Menotti's Goya "  Feinstein brought in many young singers long before their first appearances at the Metropolitan Opera. His initiative began a Washington Opera tradition of cultivating young talent. Singers nurtured through the program include Vyacheslav Polozov, Jerry Hadley and Denyce Graves, while in 1992, he brought recently retired Berlin State Opera maestro Heinz Fricke to the Washington Opera as music director.

1984-1996 Patricia Fleischer Mossel become Director of Development, Marketing, and P.R., a new position in charge of all income, both earned and contributed. In 1996 to 2000 she became Executive Director until she retired in 2000.

From 1987 to 2001, working under both Feinstein and Domingo, Edward Purrington became Artistic Administrator "at the time..(when the company).. was in the midst of a dramatic expansion. By 1995, The (Washington) Post reported, seats at the Kennedy Center were "almost as scarce" as football tickets, and "usually cost more."
 This expansion took place during the period of Feinstein's tenure when he greatly increased the number of performances per season, which had a phenomenal effect on ticket sales (the audience reportedly grew from 32,000 to more than 100,000).
Washington National Opera =
The Tenure of Patricia L. Mossel== Executive Director 1996-2000,Placido Domingo= Artistic Director

Washington National Opera

The tenure of Plácido Domingo, 2000 to 2011

Plácido Domingo, general director of the company from 2000 until 2011, began an affiliation with the opera company in 1986, when he appeared in its world premiere production of Menotti's Goya, followed by performances in a production of Tosca in the 1988/89 season. After ten years, his contract was extended through the 2010-2011 season.

During Domingo's tenure, because of "the company's solid reputation in the United States" and with the help of the opera's then-president, (Michael Sonnenreich), a bill was sponsored and passed in 2000 in the US Congress "designating the company as America's 'National Opera' ". The change of name to Washington National Opera was announced in February 2004.

"The American Ring"
Washington National Opera originally announced plans to perform Der Ring des Nibelungen, a cycle of four operas by Richard Wagner, entitled The American Ring, in November 2009.  However, in early November 2008 in view of the Great Recession, the company announced that the full cycle had been postponed.  While the first three operas of the tetralogy have already been produced during the previous WNO seasons (Das Rheingold in 2006, Die Walküre in 2007, and Siegfried in 2009), the fourth opera, Götterdämmerung, was given in a concert performance in November 2009.

Seasons which have included important new or unusual operas
During the 2007/08 season, WNO produced three rarely staged operas: William Bolcom's A View from the Bridge, G.F. Handel's Tamerlano, and Richard Strauss' Elektra. During the following season Gaetano Donizetti's Lucrezia Borgia and Benjamin Britten's Peter Grimes were given, while the 
2009-2010 season featured Richard Strauss' Ariadne auf Naxos and  Ambroise Thomas' Hamlet. In May 2012 the Washington premiere of Verdi's Nabucco took place, directed by the rising star Thaddeus Strassberger. He placed the action at the time of the opera's premiere, 1842 in Milan.  The 2014/15 includes a series of three 20-minute operas as part of its American Opera Initiative:  The Investment by John Liberatore, Daughters of the Bloody Duke by Jake Runestad, and An American Man by Rene Orth. The American Opera Initiative continues and has produced works such as Penny by Douglas Pew and Proving Up by Missy Mazzoli.  Beginning in 2013, the American Opera Initiative also commissions emerging composers to write new operas and in recent years has commissioned works by Carlos Simon, Nicolas Lell Benavides, Gity Razaz, and Frances Pollock.

Kennedy Center takes over Washington National Opera
Following the departure of Plácido Domingo as General Director at the end of the 2010-2011 season, the Kennedy Center took control of the opera company effective on 1 July 2011.  In the announcement, then-Kennedy Center President Michael Kaiser saw cost and personnel savings, plus other advantages in the takeover:

In addition to using the Kennedy Center's opera house, Kaiser said he envisions using some of the facility's other performance spaces for smaller or newer operas that might not sell as many tickets. And he wants to expand the Kennedy Center's curatorial role by presenting the work of other companies, domestic and international. "I would like to bring in some really good avant-garde opera from abroad," Kaiser said in an interview this week. He expects that the company will increase its productions, back to seven or eight a year. "I am optimistic that at least by the end of my tenure, four years from now, you'll see a season that's more robust," he said.

In May 2011, the company announced the appointment of Francesca Zambello as artistic advisor, and of the then-administrator of the company, Michael Mael, as executive director.  In June 2017, Mael concluded his tenure with the company, and the company announced that its current music director, Philippe Auguin, is to conclude his music directorship after the close of the 2017-2018 season.  In September 2017, the company announced the appointment of Timothy O'Leary as its next general director, effective 1 July 2018.

In September 2018, the company announced the extension of Zambello's contract as artistic director for an additional 3 years, and the appointment of Evan Rogister as its new principal conductor, with immediate effect, with an initial contract through the 2021-2022 season.

References
Notes

Sources
 Phillips-Matz, Mary Jane. Washington National Opera 1956 – 2006. Washington, D.C.: Washington National Opera, 2006. .

External links
Archived website from the Placido Domingo era
Current website of the Washington National Opera
Bruce Duffie, "Conversation Piece: Martin Feinstein, General Director of the Washington Opera" The Opera Journal, June 1991 on bruceduffie.com Interview, 14 June 1990, retrieved 5 April 2010

Musical groups established in 1957
Music companies based in Washington, D.C.
Members of the Cultural Alliance of Greater Washington
American opera companies
1957 establishments in Washington, D.C.
Performing arts in Washington, D.C.